Frances Joanna Bunbury (born 1814, d. 1894), born Frances Joanna Horner was a British botanist, editor, and translator.  She was married to Sir Charles Bunbury, 8th Baronet.

Written Works
 Bunbury, Frances Joana (tr.). (1852). The Life and Times of Dante Alighieri by Balbo, Cesare, 1789-1853. Volume 1 Volume 2
 Bunbury, Frances Joana (Ed.). (1894). Life, Letters, and Journals of Sir Charles J. F. Bunbury, Bart.'' Volume 3

References

British botanists
British women scientists
1814 births
1894 deaths
British editors
British women editors
Wives of baronets
19th-century British translators